The 64th running of the Tour of Flanders cycling classic was held on Sunday, 30 March 1980. The race was won by Belgian Michel Pollentier, after an ultimate attack from his breakaway companions Francesco Moser and Jan Raas, at 700 m from the finish in Meerbeke. 46 of 179 riders finished.

Route
The race started in Sint Niklaas and finished in Meerbeke (Ninove) – covering 265 km. There were ten categorized climbs:

Results

References

External links
 Video of the 1980 Tour of Flanders on Sporza (in Dutch)

Tour of Flanders
Tour of Flanders
Tour of Flanders
Tour of Flanders
1980 Super Prestige Pernod